The Indian 10-rupee coin (10) is a denomination of the Indian rupee. The ₹10 coin is the second highest-denomination coin minted in India since its introduction in 2005. The present ₹10 coin in circulation is from the 2019 design. However, the previous ₹10 coins minted before 2019 are also legal tender in India. All ₹10 coins containing with and without the rupee currency sign are legal tender, as stated by the Reserve Bank of India. Along with the standard designs, there are 4 different designs for this denomination and this is used alongside the 10 rupee banknote.

Design

2005 design (Unity in Diversity) 

The first ₹10 coin minted in 2005 had a diameter of 27 mm and featured the lettering "भारत" and "INDIA" on the top, with Lion capital with 'Satyameva Jayate' in Hindi below at left, and the date of mint below it on the obverse. On the reverse of the coin it featured the "Four heads sharing a common body" – cross with a dot in each quadrant in the center, with the lettering "दस रुपये" and "TEN RUPEES" on the outer ring.

2008 design (Connectivity & Technology) 

The second design featured two horizontal lines. The coin featured the lettering "भारत" and "INDIA" on the top, with Lion Capital in the middle and year of printing at bottom on the obverse. The reverse of the coin featured 15 notches and numeral 10 in the middle and at below line the word Rupees in English and रुपये in Hindi was written.

This coin is rumored to be a fake one due to chaos on social media. However, the Reserve Bank of India (RBI) issued an official statement to address these rumors declaring that the old the design prior to 2011 is valid and is legal tender.

2011 design

The third design of the ₹10 coin, minted since 2011 features the lettering "भारत" on left and "INDIA" on right on the outer rings
, and the year of mint and mint mark below. At the center part of the coin's obverse is the Lion capital with the lettering "सत्यमेव जयते" below it. On the reverse it features 10 notches with the  sign below it, and the number 10 below the  sign.

2019 design

The fourth design of the ₹10 coin, minted since 2019, featured the Lion capital, the lettering "सत्यमेव जयते" in the center plug and the lettering "भारत" on left and "INDIA" on right on the outer ring. On the reverse side of the coin is the number 10 below the  currency sign, the year of issue and eight stylized grain stalks. Designed with the help of student of National Institute of Design, Ahmedabad.

₹10 coin

Mintmark
The mintmark is featured at the bottom on the obverse of the ₹10 coin.
 ⧫ (small dot/diamond) = Mumbai
 ° (circular dot) = Noida
 ⋆ (star) = Hyderabad
 (no mintmark) = Kolkata

Fake coin rumour

In July 2016, some shopkeepers in India were reported to be refusing to accept the 10 coin entirely, the result of a rumour circulating on social media. It was initially claimed that coins with a 15 notch reverse design lacking the '₹' symbol were fake, compared to the 10 notch version using the symbol introduced in 2011.

It was later clarified by the Reserve Bank of India (RBI) that the "alleged fake" coin was the earlier 2008 design, which predated the adoption of the '₹' symbol in 2010, and was still in legal circulation, along with the 2011 design and those refusing to accept it could face legal action.

In February 2018, the Reserve Bank of India began an awareness campaign of sending SMS text messages about the 10 coins with 10 and 15 radiating lines. Both are valid.

See also
Modern Indian coins
Indian 10-rupee note

References

Coins of India
Rupee
Ten-base-unit coins